Atriplex paludosa subsp. baudinii is subspecies of Atriplex paludosa (marsh saltbush) that is endemic to Western Australia.

Description
It grows as an erect shrub up to a metre high. Leaves are oval in shape, one to four centimetres long, 2 to 15 millimetres wide, and scaly all over.

Taxonomy
It was first published as Atriplex paludosa var. Baudini by Alfred Moquin-Tandon in 1849, based on specimens collected by during the Baudin expedition. The orthography of Baudini was later altered to baudinii. At the same time, Moquin-Tandon published Atriplex drummondii, based on specimens collected by James Drummond, but the latter name is now considered a taxonomic synonym of the former. In 1938, Paul Aellen promoted the variety to subspecies rank. At the same time, the inexplicably published Atriplex paludosa var. typica for this taxon, a name that is invalid, illegal and superfluous.

Distribution and habitat
It occurs almost exclusively within the Southwest Botanical Province of Western Australia.

References

paludosa subsp. baudinii
Eudicots of Western Australia
Caryophyllales of Australia
Plant subspecies